Marcel-Bruno Gensoul (12 October 1880 – 30 December 1973) was a French admiral who commanded the Force de Raid, based at Brest until the Armistice of 22 June 1940. Then, the force was transferred to Mers El Kébir in French North Africa.

Gensoul was subsequently involved in abortive negotiations with British Admiral James Somerville that culminated in the bombardment and Attack on Mers-el-Kébir the  3 July 1940. Gensoul never commented on these events.

References

1973 deaths
French military personnel of World War II
French Navy admirals
1880 births